Captain's Glory is a novel by William Shatner, co-written with Judith and Garfield Reeves-Stevens, based upon the television series Star Trek. The novel was released in 2006 in hardcover format. It is the final novel in the "Totality" trilogy.  The story began with Captain's Peril and continued with Captain's Blood.

Synopsis
With the civil war on Romulus averted, Kirk is finally free to seek out the truth behind the death of his oldest and closest friend. Was Spock killed by the shadowy organisation known as the Totality? A generous offer from Starfleet provides him with the starship he needs in order to reach his goal. Their only proviso: that they can call on his help if they need him.

But what happened to Spock is not Kirk's only worry: Joseph, his son, is rebelling wildly against the restrictions placed on him as the price of Romulan peace. Is the Totality somehow also linked to Joseph's rage? But before he can find the answers to either troubling question, Kirk receives a call from Admiral Janeway, telling him she needs him to save the Federation.

Torn between his mission and his duty, the cause of the Federation must claim him one more time before he can turn his attention either to his friend or to his son.

See also
List of Star Trek: Voyager novels

External links

2002 American novels
Novels by William Shatner
Novels by Judith and Garfield Reeves-Stevens
Novels based on Star Trek: The Original Series
Novels based on Star Trek: The Next Generation
Novels based on Star Trek: Voyager
Novels set in the 24th century